George S. Gaadt is an American artist, illustrator, and portraiture painter who was born in Erie, Pennsylvania.

Studying at The Columbus College of Art and Design, he began his celebrated career working for Hallmark Cards. Although, the bulk of his career has involved producing work for sports and military organisations.  He worked for the National Football League for twenty-five years as an Illustrator and Photographer. Meanwhile completing projects for the Major League Baseball, Basketball and Football Halls of Fame, as well as producing paintings for the Pittsburgh Steelers 50th and 75th Anniversaries.

His military artwork highlights have included painting several pieces for the US Army in Europe and Korea, and having his painting "Last Stand at Fort Ligonier" featured in "200 Years of American Illustration," an exhibition at The New York Historical Society Museum.

Gaadt is a member of the New York Society of Illustrators, and his work has featured in many of their exhibitions and annuals.  He has taught and lectured on art, art history, illustration and design, and held positions at the Carnegie-Mellon University and the Sweetwater Center for the Arts in Sewickley, Pennsylvania.

His work has been exhibited globally, spanning England, Germany, Switzerland, Italy and China.

Of his more than ninety awards, he has been honoured by his former college as an Outstanding Alumni, the Juror-NY Society of illustrators, and the NASA Art Team. The Columbus College of Art and Design recently awarded him an honorary Masters of Visual Arts degree.

References 

 About The Artist gaadtstudio.com (Retrieved 5 March 2011.)
 Pittsburgh Oil Painters West Penn Art (Retrieved 5 March 2011.)

See also 

 Book jackets by George Gaadt jacketflap.com
 Book Covers by George S Gaadt jacketflap.com
 Ten Valuable Green Bay Packers Collectibles William J. Felchner
 Charlie Stewart Non-Fiction Sticker Books Charlie Stewart (features a cover by George Gaadt.)

American illustrators
20th-century American painters
Artists from Erie, Pennsylvania
21st-century American painters